Aenetus scotti is a moth of the family Hepialidae. It is known from New South Wales and Queensland.

References

Moths described in 1869
Hepialidae